Sustainable Remediation is a term adopted internationally and encompasses sustainable approaches, as described by the Brundtland Report, to the investigation, assessment and management (including institutional controls) of potentially contaminated land and groundwater.

The process of  identifying sustainable remediation is defined by The UK Sustainable remediation Forum  as “the practice of demonstrating, in terms of environmental, economic and social indicators, that the benefit of undertaking remediation is greater than its impact, and that the optimum remediation solution is selected through the use of a balanced decision-making process.”

Sustainable remediation is the practice of considering the effects of implementing an environmental cleanup and incorporating options to minimize the footprint of the cleanup actions. Opportunities for green and sustainable practices exist throughout the site remediation process of remedial investigation, design, construction, operation, and monitoring. Five core elements are evaluated as part of the environmental footprint analysis including 1) energy, 2) air and atmosphere, 3) materials and waste, 4) land and ecosystem, and 5) water.  The cleanup remedy is evaluated for each core element to 1) minimize total energy use and maximize renewable energy use, 2) minimize air pollutants and greenhouse gas emissions, 3) minimize water use and impacts to water resources, 4) reduce, reuse, and recycle materials and waste, and 5) minimize land use and protect ecosystems.

References

External links
American Society of Testing and Materials Standard Guide for Greener Cleanups
CL:AIRE - Contaminated Land: Applications in Real Environments
Interstate Technology and Resource Council Green and Sustainable Remediation
Sustainable Remediation Forum Online Resources
United States Environmental Protection Agency Contaminated Site Cleanup Information Green Remediation Focus

Soil contamination